Auburn Township, Illinois refers to one of the following places:

Auburn Township, Clark County, Illinois
Auburn Township, Sangamon County, Illinois

There is also:
Mount Auburn Township, Christian County, Illinois

See also

Auburn Township (disambiguation)

Illinois township disambiguation pages